Beixinqiao may refer to:

Beixinqiao Station
Beixinqiao Subdistrict